Sweet Sounds by the Browns is a 1959 album by American country music trio, The Browns, originally released by RCA Victor. The album contains their number one hit single "The Three Bells". In 2000, this album and another RCA Victor album, Grand Ole Opry Favorites, were reissued together on one compact disc.

Track listing

Side one
 "The Three Bells" (Jean Villard Gilles, Marc Herrand, Bert Reisfeld) – 2:52
 "Indian Love Call" (Rudolf Friml, Oscar Hammerstein, Otto Harbach) – 2:10
 "Only the Lonely" – 2:10
 "Dream On" – 1:51
 "Blues Stay Away from Me" (Alton Delmore, Rabon Delmore) – 2:39
 "Where Did the Sunshine Go" – 2:06

Side two
 "Unchained Melody" (Alex North, Hy Zaret) – 2:30
 "I Still Do" – 2:35
 "Love Me Tender" (Vera Matson, Elvis Presley) – 2:28
 "We Should Be Together" – 2:11
 "Put on an Old Pair of Shoes" – 1:57
 "Hi de Ank Tum" – 1:47

Personnel
Jim Ed Brown – vocals
Maxine Brown – vocals
Bonnie Brown – vocals
Chet Atkins – guitar
John D. Loudermilk – guitar
Hank Garland – guitar
Ray Edenton – guitar
Bob Moore – bass
Buddy Harman – drums
Floyd Cramer – piano
Background vocals by Anita Kerr, Dottie Dillard, Louis Nunley, Bill Wright
Arranged and conducted by Chet Atkins

External links
CMT Entry for "Sweet Sounds by the Browns"
CMT Entry for 2000 "Sweet Sounds by the Browns"/"Grand Ole Opry Favorites" CD

The Browns albums
1959 albums
Albums produced by Chet Atkins
RCA Victor albums